Martin Damm and Brett Steven were the defending champions, but none competed this year.

Mark Keil and Peter Nyborg won the title by defeating Guillaume Raoux and Greg Rusedski 6–7, 6–4, 7–6 in the final.

Seeds

Draw

Draw

References

External links
 Official results archive (ATP)
 Official results archive (ITF)

1995 Copenhagen Open – 2
1995 ATP Tour